Rapid hormone cycling is a procedure in which drugs that block the production of male hormones are alternated with male hormones and/or drugs that promote the production of male hormones. This procedure is being studied in the treatment of prostate cancer.

References
 Rapid hormone cycling entry in the public domain NCI Dictionary of Cancer Terms

Experimental cancer treatments